The women's doubles tournament of the 2014 Copenhagen World Championships (World Badminton Championships) took place from August 25 to 31. Wang Xiaoli and Yu Yang enter the competition as the current champions.

Seeds

  Bao Yixin / Tang Jinhua (second round)
  Christinna Pedersen / Kamilla Rytter Juhl (third round)
  Misaki Matsutomo / Ayaka Takahashi (third round)
  Wang Xiaoli / Yu Yang (final)
  Tian Qing / Zhao Yunlei (champion)
  Jang Ye-na / Kim So-young (quarterfinals)
  Reika Kakiiwa / Miyuki Maeda (semifinals)
  Luo Ying / Luo Yu (quarterfinals)

  Jung Kyung-eun / Kim Ha-na (third round)
  Nitya Krishinda Maheswari / Greysia Polii (quarterfinals)
  Pia Zebadiah Bernadet / Rizki Amelia Pradipta (third round)
  Duanganong Aroonkesorn / Kunchala Voravichitchaikul (third round)
  Ko A-ra / Yoo Hae-won (third round)
  Eefje Muskens / Selena Piek (third round)
  Line Damkjær Kruse / Marie Røpke (third round)
  Lee So-hee / Shin Seung-chan (semifinals)

Draw

Finals

Section 1

Section 2

Section 3

Section 4

References
BWF Website

2014 BWF World Championships
BWF